Stocksdale is an English surname; see Stockdale for additional information.

Spelling Variations
The family name has several different spellings that have appeared historically. Some of those variations are Stockdale, Stogdel, Stogsdill, Stockdel, Stogdill, Stoxdale, and Stockstill.

People
Bob Stocksdale (1913–2003), American woodturner
Nancy R. Stocksdale (born 1934), American politician
Otis Stocksdale (1871–1933), American baseball player and coach
Vaughn Stocksdale (born 1939), American politician